ECRC may stand for:

Sport
 Eastern Canadian Ringette Championships
 Eastern Collegiate Racquetball Conference
 East Coast Rugby Conference, a college rugby competition in the United States
 East Coast Rowing Council, represents coastal rowing clubs off the east coast of Ireland

Other
 Enron Creditors Recovery Corp., liquidated Enron's assets
 Edinburgh Cancer Research Centre
 Expeditionary Combat Readiness Center, a support organisation in the U.S. Navy
 Eastern Counties Road Car Company, a bus company in Ipswich, England — merged into the Eastern Counties Omnibus Company